The 1989 San Diego State Aztecs football team represented San Diego State University during the 1989 NCAA Division I-A football season as a member of the Western Athletic Conference (WAC).

The team was led by head coach Al Luginbill, in his first year. They played home games at Jack Murphy Stadium in San Diego, California. They completed the season above .500 for the first time in three years, with a record of six wins, five losses and one tie (6–5–1, 4–3 WAC).

Schedule

Team players in the NFL
The following were selected in the 1990 NFL Draft.

Team awards

Notes

References

San Diego State
San Diego State Aztecs football seasons
San Diego State Aztecs football